In the history of thermodynamics, Thermodynamik chemischer Vorgänge (Chemical thermodynamic process) is an 1882 paper written by German physicist Hermann von Helmholtz. It is one of the founding papers in thermodynamics, along with Josiah Willard Gibbs's 1876 paper "On the Equilibrium of Heterogeneous Substances". Together they form the foundation of chemical thermodynamics as well as a large part of physical chemistry.

References

Thermodynamics
Historical physics publications
Physics papers